Henry Mee (born 1955) is a British painter. He read Fine Art at the University of Leeds awarded a place by Professor Sir Lawrence Gowing, graduating in 1979.

On 23 May 1990 Arts Minister Richard Luce MP opened Mee's one man show British Eminencies: Portraits of our Age at Sotheby's London and unveiled his portrait of HM The Queen Elizabeth II.

The novelist Anthony Powell CH wrote the accompanying catalogue descriptions of the thirty-one paintings. His sitters were: The Queen; Lord Carrington KG CH; The Princess Royal; Lord Wilson of Rievaulx KG; Lord Home of the Hirsel; Lord Hailsham of Saint Marylebone CH; Lord Armstrong of Ilminster Cabinet Secretary; Baroness Park of Monmouth Principal Somerville College, Oxford; Professor Dorothy Hodgkin OM Chancellor University of Bristol; Lord Penney of East Hendred OM; Lord Zuckerman of Burnham Thorpe OM; Admiral Lord Fieldhouse of Gosport; Admiral Sir John Woodward; Sir John Harvey Jones Chairman ICI; Sir Peter Walters Chairman BP; Lord Forte of Ripley; Sir Yehudi Menuhin; Anthony Powell CH; Sir Hugh Casson CH PPRA; Sir Roger de Grey President of the Royal Academy; Sir Richard Attenborough; Sir John Mills; Sir Peter Hall Director National Theatre; Sir Robin Day; Sir Peter Imbert Commissioner Metropolitan Police; General Sir Frank Kitson; Robert Runcie MC Archbishop of Canterbury; Neil MacGregor Director National Gallery; Lord Denning of Whitchurch; and Lord King of Wartnaby.

The Parliamentary Works of Art Committee commissioned Mee to paint Prime Minister Margaret Thatcher, former Prime Ministers Lord (Harold) Wilson, and Lord (Alec) Douglas-Home, Lord (Denis) Healey and the Queen.

On 28 September 1995 The British Red Cross unveiled Henry Mee's portrait of Princess Diana at Christie's London.  The Princess sat for Mee at Kensington Palace.

September 2001 Fine Art Society London, retrospective exhibition Henry Mee Portraits of Eminent Britons.

Lord Melvyn Bragg wrote the catalogue notes for New British Eminencies.  His sitters were: Prime Minister Boris Johnson MP; Governor of the Bank of England Lord (Mervyn) King; Chancellor of the Exchequer George Osborne MP; First Secretary of State Foreign and Commonwealth Affairs Lord (William) Hague of Richmond; Lord Chancellor and Secretary of State for Justice Lord (Kenneth) Clarke of Nottingham CH QC PC; Lord (Alistair) Darling of Roulanish, Chancellor of the Exchequer; Alastair Campbell, Downing Street Director of Communications and Strategy; General Sir Mike Jackson GCB CBE DSO ADC DL, Chief of the General Staff; David Miliband MP, Secretary of State for Foreign and Commonwealth Affairs; Lord (Chris) Patten CH PC Governor Hong Kong 1992-7, Chancellor Oxford University, Chairman BBC Trust; Sir Vince Cable MP, Secretary of State for Business, President of the Board of Trade; The Baroness (Eliza) Manningham-Buller DCB, Director General of MI5; The Baroness (PD) James of Holland Park CBE FRSA FRSL, Author; Sir George Martin CBE, Beatles Producer, Parlophone; The Lord (Melvyn) Bragg of Wigton, Chancellor University of Leeds, Editor of the South Bank Show; Gerald Scarfe CBE RDI; and Lord in Appeal in Ordinary Lord (Leonard) Hoffmann of Chedworth PC BCL MA.

Henry Mee is married with two sons and lives in Hampstead.

External links
 Henry Mee Portrait Painter Website

References

1955 births
British portrait painters
20th-century British painters
British male painters
21st-century British painters
Living people
20th-century British male artists
21st-century British male artists